Clifford Nolen Richardson (January 18, 1903 – September 25, 1951) was a third baseman in  Major League Baseball. He was born in Chattanooga, Tennessee and attended college at the University of Georgia where he was a member of the Sigma Chi fraternity.

Richardson played for the Detroit Tigers, New York Yankees and Cincinnati Reds in a span of six seasons between 1929 and 1939. In 168 career games, he collected 117 hits in 473 at bats for a .247 batting average.

In between, Richardson was the shortstop and team captain of the 1937 Newark Bears, which is widely regarded as the best in Minor League Baseball history. Afterwards, Richardson became the head baseball coach at the University of Georgia.

Richardson died on September 25, 1951 in Athens, Georgia.

Sources

External links
, or Retrosheet, or The Deadball Era

1903 births
1951 deaths
Baseball players from Tennessee
Cincinnati Reds players
Detroit Tigers players
Fort Worth Panthers players
Georgia Bulldogs baseball coaches
Georgia Bulldogs baseball players
Indianapolis Indians players
Major League Baseball third basemen
New York Yankees players
People from Chattanooga, Tennessee
Toronto Maple Leafs (International League) players